Mário Jorge Moinhos Matos (born 13 May 1949), known as Moinhos, is a Portuguese former footballer who played as a forward.

Club career
Born in Vila Nova de Gaia, Porto District, Moinhos started playing professionally in 1969, with Porto-based club Boavista FC. After two solid last seasons, especially 1972–73 when he scored 15 goals in 29 games to help his team to the seventh position, he moved to Primeira Liga giants S.L. Benfica.

During his four-year spell in Lisbon, Moinhos appeared intermittently but did contribute 57 matches and 20 goals from 1974 to 1976, eventually helping Benfica to three consecutive national championships. In 1977 he returned to Boavista, where he remained three further seasons.

Moinhos finished his career after four years with S.C. Espinho, retiring at the age of 35 after the end of the 1983–84 campaign with his side being relegated. In the following decades he would again work with Boavista, in its coaching departments, while also being undermined by health problems and poor finances.

International career
Whilst at Benfica, Moinhos won seven caps for Portugal, scoring once. He made his debut on 24 April 1975 in a 2–0 friendly win in Paris against France, and appeared for the last time on 16 October 1976 in a 0–2 home loss to Poland, at the beginning of the 1978 FIFA World Cup qualifiers.

|}

Honours
Benfica
Primeira Liga: 1974–75, 1975–76, 1976–77
Taça de Portugal runner-up: 1973–74, 1974–75

References

External links

1949 births
Living people
Sportspeople from Vila Nova de Gaia
Portuguese footballers
Association football forwards
Primeira Liga players
Boavista F.C. players
S.L. Benfica footballers
S.C. Espinho players
Portugal international footballers